Chris Green may refer to:

Sports
 Chris Green (American football) (born 1968), NFL defensive back
 Chris Green (baseball) (born 1960), former Major League Baseball pitcher
 Chris Green (cricketer) (born 1993), Australian cricketer
 Chris Green (horseman) (1820–1874), British steeplechase rider and trainer
 Chris Green (rugby league) (born 1989), English rugby league player

Other
 Chris Green (charity worker), founder of ATE Superweeks, campaigner for summer camps in Britain
 Chris Green (politician) (born 1973), Conservative MP, British politician
 Chris Green (railway manager) (born 1943), British railwayman
 Chris Green (White Ribbon Campaign), executive director of the White Ribbon Campaign
 Chris D. Green, Canadian psychologist and historian of psychology

See also
 Christopher Green (disambiguation)
 Chris Greene (disambiguation)